Mervyn Baggallay (7 December 1887 – 19 March 1961) was an English cricketer. He played eight first-class matches for Cambridge University Cricket Club in 1911.

See also
 List of Cambridge University Cricket Club players

References

External links
 

1887 births
1961 deaths
English cricketers
Cambridge University cricketers
Cricketers from Greater London